Spruce Lake Bog is a  bog in Fond du Lac County, Wisconsin. It is located within Kettle Moraine State Forest. The bog was designated a Wisconsin State Natural Area in 1968 and a National Natural Landmark in 1973.

References

Bogs of Wisconsin
Protected areas of Fond du Lac County, Wisconsin
National Natural Landmarks in Wisconsin
State Natural Areas of Wisconsin
Landforms of Fond du Lac County, Wisconsin
1968 establishments in Wisconsin
Protected areas established in 1968